Carl Eduard Gesell (11 May 1845 – 8 April 1894) was a German organ builder.

Life 
Born  in Potsdam, Kingdom of Prussia, Gesell was trained in the Potsdam organ workshop of his father Carl Ludwig Gesell and with Franz Wilhelm Sonreck in Cologne. He then worked for Friedrich Meyer in Herford. After his father's death in 1867, he took over his father's Potsdam firm. He continued the tradition of the firm and built mainly single-manual organs for churches in the Mittelmark region. In addition, he won orders from abroad and exported organs to Buenos Aires and Constantinople, now Istanbul. In addition, he carried out a large number of organ conversions and repairs. Carl Eduard Gesell remained childless. After his death in 1894, his pupil Alexander Schuke took over the firm and developed it into the renowned Alexander Schuke Potsdam Orgelbau company.

Works (selection)

Mittelmark and Argentina 

Among Gesell's most extensive new buildings were the organs for the Klosterkirche St. Pauli in Brandenburg an der Havel. (1868) with two manuals, 27 organ stops and pedal, for the German Protestant church in Buenos Aires (1871) with likewise two manuals, twelve stops and pedal and for the churches in Herzberg (1885) and Golm (1886) each with two manuals, eleven stops and pedal. In 1867 he extended the organ of the company founder Gottlieb Heise from 1847 in the Church of Peace, Potsdam from 18 to 25 stops. In 1882, he carried out a further conversion on the Joachim Wagner organ of 1731 in the Garnisonkirche. In 1887 he rebuilt the organ he himself had made in 1874 in the Neo-Gothic brick church in Paaren im Glien.

Organ of the Istanbul Kreuzkirche 
On the occasion of the 120th anniversary of the Gesell organ in the Evangelical Church of the Holy Cross in Istanbul, the German-speaking congregation in Turkey published a commemorative publication in 2004. The organ was built in 1883 by Carl Eduard Gesell and installed and inaugurated in 1884. It was equipped with two manuals, one pedal and a total of twelve organ stops and two . The annual report of the congregation from the year 1882/83 notes among other things:

In 1964/65, the organ was redesigned by Werner Bosch and in the 2000s the congregation turned to the builder's workshop  to have it overhauled. Schuke was not aware of the organ's whereabouts until that time; the instrument was listed in the catalogue of works, but with the note "receipt unknown". In 2003, during a visit to Istanbul, Matthias Schuke discovered that of all the surviving Gesell organs, only the Istanbul one still had an original stop (Principal 8′) and the original casing.

References

Further reading 
 Alexander Schuke Potsdam Orgelbau GmbH: 100 Jahre Alexander Schuke Orgelbau in Potsdam. thomasius verlag – Thomas Helms, Schwerin 1994.
 Evangelische Gemeinde deutscher Sprache in der Türkei: 120 Jahre Gesell-Orgel in der Evangelischen Kreuzkirche zu Istanbul. Eine Festschrift zum Jubiläumsjahr 2004. Istanbul 2004. Online.

External links 
 Alexander Schuke Potsdam Orgelbau GmbH, catalogue raisonné. The list contains all new constructions, alterations and repairs by Carl Eduard Gesell, with details of the stops, manuals and pedals.

German pipe organ builders
1845 births
1894 deaths
People from Potsdam